East Mey is a scattered crofting village in northern Caithness, Scottish Highlands and is in the Scottish council area of Highland.

References

Populated places in Caithness